King Ethelbert School is a mixed secondary school located in Birchington-on-Sea, Kent, England. A wide variety of subjects are available at GCSE level.

Facilities
The school was one of the last to benefit from the Building Schools for the Future programme. A Sixth Form block opened recently.

Notable alumni
 Tracey Emin — visual artist

References

External links
Official site
Ofsted
Compare School Performance

Academies in Kent
Secondary schools in Kent